Mattituck Airport  is a public use airport located one nautical mile (2 km) southeast of the central business district of Mattituck, a hamlet in the Town of Southold, Suffolk County, New York, United States. It is privately owned by Mattituck Airport, LLC.

Facilities and aircraft 
It has one runway designated 1/19 with a 2,200 x 60 ft (671 x 18 m) asphalt surface. For the 12-month period ending September 27, 2007, the airport had 12,200 aircraft operations, an average of 33 per day: 98% general aviation and 2% air taxi. At that time there were 32 single-engine aircraft based at this airport.

References

External links 
 at NYSDOT airport directory

Southold, New York
Airports in Suffolk County, New York